PA6 may refer to:
 Pennsylvania Route 6
 Pennsylvania Route 6 (1920s)
 Pennsylvania's 6th congressional district
 Piper PA-6, a four-seat light aircraft of the 1940s
 Pitcairn PA-6 Super Mailwing, a biplane of the 1920s
 Polyamide 6, or Nylon 6, a synthetic fibre